Okechukwu Oku , also known as Okey Oku and nicknamed "the Oracle", is a Nigerian film producer, director, cinematographer and occasional musician. He is best known for directing the movies Love and Oil (2014), Burning Bridges (2014) and Bambitious (2014) which featured Belinda Effah and Daniel K Daniel.

Early life
Oku was born in Enugu, south-eastern Nigeria and is the second of eleven children of Goddy and Winifred Oku. He is of Igbo descent and hails from Ukpo in Dunukofia local government area of Anambra State. His father, Goddy was a popular Nigerian musician in the 1970s and his mother Winifred Oku is a retired Nigerian Civil Servant. Oku’s younger brother, Udoka 'Selebobo' Oku, is a music producer and singer.

Oku began his formal education at the WTC Primary School in Enugu and went on to St. Charles Special Science School, Onitsha, Anambra State. Halfway through his University education, Oku left school to pursue his passion in the arts; Oku immersed himself in music, recording a few gospel tracks of his own and producing music for a number of musicians in Southeast Nigeria, Oku eventually veered into the art of music video directing.

Career

In 2001, Oku began shooting music videos for a number of music performers from South Eastern Nigerian including Resonance (Lee Lee), Flavour N'abania (Ada Ada) and SeleBobo. His love for cinematography grew stronger thus leading to his gradual venture into feature film production in 2011.

Oku began working as a cinematographer and film editor in 2011 and worked on a number of African movies including The Great Niger Mission (2011, Nigeria), Brother's Keeper (2012, Nigeria), Jafaar (2012, Nigeria), Reflection (2012, Sierra Leone), Last 3 Digits (2012, Nigeria), Refugee (2013, Ghana), and The Duplex (2013, Nigeria).

In 2013, Oku began directing and producing his own feature films; Love and Oil (2014, Nigeria), Burning Bridges (2014, Nigeria), The Bible (2014, Nigeria), The Boss is Mine (2016, Nigeria), and Black Rose (2016, Nigeria, released 2018)

His work as an Editor and Cinematographer in the 2014 Feature Film, Brother's Keeper earned him nominations at the 2013 Golden Icons Academy Movie Awards for Best Cinematography, as well as the 2014 Nollywood Movies Awards for Best Editing.

In 2015, Oku received several awards at the Afrifimo Awards and Film /Music Festival including the award for Best Film Director, Best Cinematographer and Best Video Editor. His movie Bambitious, which features Nigerian Actor Daniel K Daniel, also took home the gong for Best Independent Film and Best Romance

In December 2015, Oku was nominated for Best Cinematographer for a Movie or TV Series at the 2016 African Magic Viewers' Choice Awards (AMVCA) for the film The Refugees''.

Personal life

Oku is married to Queendalyn Oku. They have three children and live in Enugu, Nigeria.

Filmography

Feature Films

Music Videos
Lee Lee (Resonance)
Ada Ada (Flavour N'abania)
Yoyo (Selebobo)

Accolades

See also
 List of Nigerian film producers

References

Living people
People from Anambra State
Year of birth missing (living people)
Nigerian film producers
Nigerian musicians
Nigerian cinematographers
Nigerian music video directors
Nigerian film directors
Nigerian male musicians